The Wreck of the Hesperus is a 1927 American silent film based on the famous poem. It was an early screenplay credit for later film director John Farrow.

Cast
Sam De Grasse as Capt. David Slocum
Virginia Bradford as Gale Slocum
Francis Ford as John Hazzard
Francis Marion as John Hazzard Jr.
Alan Hale as Singapore Jack
Ethel Wales as Deborah Slocum
Josephine Norman as The Bride
Milton Holmes as Zeke
Jimmy Aldine as Cabin boy (credited as James Aldine)
Budd Fine as First Mate
Slim Summerville

Preservation status
This film is now lost.

References

External links

The Wreck of the Hesperus at New York Times

The Wreck of the Hesperus at Silent Era Films

1927 films
American silent feature films
Films based on works by Henry Wadsworth Longfellow
1927 drama films
Silent American drama films
American black-and-white films
Films about seafaring accidents or incidents
Pathé Exchange films
Films directed by Elmer Clifton
1920s American films
Silent adventure films